Cerithiopsis diadema is a species of sea snail, a gastropod in the family Cerithiopsidae, which is known from European oceans. It was described by Monterosato in 1874.

References

diadema
Gastropods described in 1874